Tuesday Maybe is the fifth studio album by English electronic music duo Way Out West, released on 16 June 2017 on Anjunadeep. It is the duo's first album after their near eight-year hiatus. The album was preceded with the release of its titular single on 19 February 2016, and "Set My Mind" on 9 September 2016. Additionally, three singles were released in the following year: "Oceans" (featuring Liu Bei), "The Call" (featuring Doe Paoro) and "Slam". On 2 February 2018, a remix album titled Tuesday Maybe (Remixed) was released on digital download stores. On 20 April 2018, an EP comprising chill-out mixes of tracks from the album, titled Sunday Maybe, was released.

Background
After the release of the Way Out West's fourth studio album We Love Machine in 2009, Wisternoff and Warren briefly parted ways and pursued solo DJ and artist careers. In 2012, Wisternoff signed to Anjunadeep released his debut album as a solo artist, Trails We Blaze. He later began touring with Warren once again, and the duo reunited as Way Out West, touring with several tracks that would later feature on the album.

The duo signed to Anjunadeep in 2016 and began releasing singles for the album's release in the following year. On 16 June 2017, the album was released to positive reviews.

The album's title comes from the lyrics of "Petrococadollar" by Scritti Politti, which the title track, "Tuesday Maybe", samples.

Track listing

Personnel
Way Out West
 Jody Wisternoff – keyboards, synths, samples, programming, writing
 Nick Warren – engineering, mixing, writing

Featured artists
 Eliza Noble – vocals, writing (track 1)
 Jennifer Skillman – vocals, writing (track 1)
 Richard Walters – vocals, writing (track 3)
 Sonia Kreitzer – vocals, writing (track 5)
 Hendrik Burkhard – vocals, writing (track 7)
 Krister Linder – vocals, writing (track 10)

Sunday Maybe

On 3 April 2018, Way Out West announced an extended play (EP) titled Sunday Maybe; comprising five chill-out mixes of tracks from Tuesday Maybe. The EP was released on Anjunadeep, on 20 April 2018. Its release was supported by its titular single, "Sunday Maybe", on 3 April 2018.

Track listing

Charts

Release history
Tuesday Maybe

Sunday Maybe

References

2017 albums
Way Out West (duo) albums
Anjunabeats albums